Kunjiran Madhavan, popularly known as TK Madhavan is an Indian cricketer, who played 26 first-class matches between 1956 and 1967 for Tamil nadu, as well as Kerala. Mahadevan played as a fast medium bowler and his pace attack along with Kerala’s CK Bhaskaran Nair often intimidated even the strongest batsmen of that era.

References

External links
 

    
1939 births
Living people
Kerala cricketers
Tamil Nadu cricketers
Indian cricketers
South Zone cricketers